The corbeta (corvette) ARA Uruguay, built in England, is the largest ship afloat of its age in the Armada de la República Argentina (Argentine Navy), with more than 140 years passed since its commissioning in September 1874. The last of the legendary squadron of President Sarmiento, the Uruguay took part in revolutions, ransoms, expeditions, rescues, and was even floating headquarters of the Navy School. During its operational history 1874–1926 the Uruguay has served as a gunboat, school ship, expedition support ship, Antarctic rescue ship, fisheries base supply ship, and hydrographic survey vessel, and is now a museum ship in Buenos Aires. This ship may be the oldest in South America having been built in 1874 at Laird Bros. (now Cammell Laird) shipyard of Birkenhead, England, at a cost of £32,000. This ship is rigged to a barque sailplan (three masts, two of which have cross spars). The ship's steel hull is sheathed in teak.

The ship's namesake is an earlier Argentine Navy schooner, a seven-gun combatant in the Battle of Juncal, 1827.

History

Gunboat and training ship (1874–1887)
Originally built as a gunboat, the ship was soon to be used as a training ship.

Naval training headquarters ship (1887)
After an episode known as the "Mutiny of the Overcoats" ("el Motín de los Gabanes" de Zárate) affected the continuity of studies in the emerging Naval Academy, the ship became a floating headquarters for naval training. In 1879, the gunboat, anchored in Buenos Aires, witnessed the graduation of the academy's first class of Naval Officers.

Asserting Argentina's sovereignty claim to Patagonia (1878)
In 1878 it became part of the expedition of Commodore Louis Py to Patagonia, south of the Santa Cruz River, along with the monitor Los Andes and the gunboat Constitución, with the goal of asserting Argentina's sovereignty claim on that region, threatened by Chile.

First scientific expedition (1884)
In 1884 it transported foreign scientific committees who came to observe a Transit of Venus (the passage of the disk of Venus across the Sun).

Configured for expedition support (1887-1903)

In 1887 the ship was removed from its training assignment and fitted for expedition support.

Rebuilt for Antarctic rescue (1903)
In 1903 the ship was extensively refitted specifically as a steam rescue ship with auxiliary sail propulsion. The original horizontal reciprocating engine was replaced with a more compact yet more powerful engine and boilers salvaged from a wreck, allowing addition of more water storage, coal bunkering and fuel oil for heating. Additional bulkheads to create a total of eight compartments and hull reinforcement were added. The bilge keels were removed to facilitate damage-free passage through ice. Hard shell above deck storm and wave protection for crew was added fore and aft. Additional insulations of cork and sawdust were added.

Rescue of the Swedish Antarctic Expedition (October 1903)
 
The ship's most notable action was carried out in 1901–1903 when the Uruguay supported and then later rescued the Swedish Antarctic Expedition led by Otto Nordenskiöld, their ship, the Antarctic, having been destroyed by ice. The rescue effort was led by Lieutenant Commander Julián Irízar who returned from his London diplomatic post of Naval Attache.

A special crew of eight officers and nineteen men was selected based upon experience, courage, and ability to withstand the severe polar conditions. With all of the expedition members rescued successfully, the ship returned through a severe storm in a thoroughly battered condition, having been rolled up to 40 degrees and now partially dismasted. Arriving first at Puerto Santa Cruz, they telegraphed their success to headquarters. On December 2, 1903, they arrived at home port to a great rejoicing by the citizens of Buenos Aires, with all participants receiving a hero's welcome from one hundred thousand dockside greeters, to be followed by many days of receptions and parades.

Support of Charcot expedition (1904–1906)
The Third French Antarctic Expedition, led by Jean-Baptiste Charcot, was supported by the Uruguay.

Base support and hydrography (1904–1922)
The ship operated through the Drake Passage, around Cape Horn, and resupplied a base in the South Orkney Islands (called by the Argentines Órcadas)  with trips to South Georgia (called by the Argentines San Pedro Island) and supporting the Argentinean Fisheries Association (Sociedad Argentina de Pesca) whaling station with coal and food supplies. During this time ship was engaged in performing hydrographic and geographic surveys for the preparation of maritime navigation charts.

Out of service (1926)
She was dismissed from service in 1926 (with 52 years of naval service), to become a floating ammunition dump.

Restoration for use as a naval museum ship (1954)
In 1954 the Uruguay was rebuilt in the Río Santiago Shipyard.  It was moored two years later at the pier of the Naval School, now officially designated as a museum ship.

Public museum ship and historic monument (1967–present)
Removed from naval service in 1962, the Uruguay was in 1967 declared a National Historic Landmark. Currently integrated since 1967 as a museum ship with the frigate ARA Presidente Sarmiento in the Museum of Sea and Navigation. It is moored at Puerto Madero in the city of Buenos Aires, in the dock area No. 3, a short distance from the Sarmiento.

Gallery

See also

 List of Antarctic exploration ships from the Heroic Age, 1897–1922
 ARA Presidente Sarmiento, a larger tall ship moored in adjacent basin number four in Puerto Madero
 Corbeta Uruguay, a military outpost established in the South Sandwich Islands 1976 to 1982, named after this ship
 Swedish Antarctic Expedition, concerning the Antarctic rescue
 ARA Paraná, sister ship of the Uruguay

Notes

References
National Commission for Museums and Monuments and Sites (1998). Monuments of Argentina. Secretariat of Culture of the Nation. .
Almanac 1958 Daily Nation, with reminders of historical dates in Argentina.

Google translation of above

SUGARA is Sindico Unico de Guardavidas y Afines de la Rep. Argentina (Trustee Union of Lifeguard and Related of Argentina)
Google translation of above

Google translation of above (Note that this article has an extensive reference list of resources in Spanish)

Google translation of above

External links

Ship Museum and Corvette Uruguay ARA - official museum site 
 (in Spanish, text only)
 
ATNA - Friends of Argentina Nautical Traditions (in Spanish), images of ARA Uruguay being moved
Some antique images (in English)
Maritime History and Archeology -  General history of the ship, with some events not described in other sites (in Spanish)
Historic photos from above site
Interior photos of the museum ship from the above site

Ships built on the River Mersey
1874 ships
Training ships of the Argentine Navy
Tall ships of Argentina
Museum ships in Argentina
Maritime history of Argentina
Exploration of Antarctica
Museums in Buenos Aires
Non-combat military operations involving Argentina
Gunboats of Argentina